This is a list of firefighting monuments and memorials which provide notable commemoration of firefighters' contributions.  It also includes some notable monuments and memorials to fire victims other than firefighters, such as the mass memorial to unknown victims of the 1871 Peshtigo fire, which caused the greatest loss of life of any fire in the United States.  A number of the monuments and memorials are listed on historic registers such as, in the U.S., the National Register of Historic Places (NRHP).

Australia
Firefighters' Memorial Grove or Firefighters Memorial Grove (2014), Kings Park, Western Australia
Mooney Memorial Fountain (1880), Brisbane, Queensland
Firefighters Memorial Wall, CFA Training College, Fiskville, Victoria, access closed in 2015
Victorian Emergency Services Memorial, Melbourne, Victoria, expected to be complete by 2019.
Fallen Firefighter Memorial, Richmond, Victoria

Canada
Canadian Firefighters Memorial, Ottawa, dedicated in 2012
The Halifax Explosion of 6 December 1917 involved a blast and fires which killed more than 2,000 persons.  One memorial work was the Halifax Explosion Memorial Sculpture which was located at the Halifax North Memorial Library, itself another memorial to the event.

Germany
Memorial, near Meinersen, to five firemen who died in the 1975 Fire on the Lüneburg Heath, the largest forest fire in the nation

Poland
A 1986 stamp commemorated the Warsaw Fire Guard

Portugal
Monumento ao Bombeiro, Sintra

United Kingdom
National Firefighters Memorial (1998), London
Statue of James Braidwood (2008), located in Parliament Square in Edinburgh, Scotland.  He founded what is asserted to be the world's first municipal fire service, in Edinburgh, after the Great Fire of Edinburgh in 1824.
Plaque for firefighter William Rae, Hunter Street, Glasgow

United States
Granite Mountain Hotshots Memorial State Park (2016), near Yarnell, Arizona, including a memorial of rock gabions
Los Angeles Fallen Firefighters Memorial, at the Los Angeles Fire Department Museum and Memorial, Los Angeles, California
The Stentorians and the African American Firefighter Museum, Los Angeles, California
California Firefighters Memorial, Sacramento, California.  The memorial is a wall with all the names of hundreds of firefighters.
California State Capitol Museum,  Sacramento, California.
IAFF Fallen Fire Fighter Memorial, Colorado Springs, Colorado
Wildland Firefighters National Monument (2000), Boise, Idaho
St. Maries 1910 Fire Memorial (1924), St. Maries, Idaho
Wallace 1910 Fire Memorial (1921), Wallace, Idaho
Memorial honoring firefighters fallen in the 1910 Stockyard fire, at the Union Stock Yard Gate, Chicago, Illinois
Indiana Law Enforcement and Firefighters Memorial (2001), Indianapolis, Indiana
National Fallen Firefighters Memorial (1981), Emmitsburg, Maryland
Firemen's Memorial (Boston) (1909), Boston, Massachusetts
Upper Peninsula Firefighters Memorial Museum, at the historic Calumet Fire Station, Calumet, Michigan
Firemen's Monument (Hoboken, New Jersey) (1891)
Keansburg Firemen's Memorial Park (1938), Keansburg, New Jersey
New York State Fallen Firefighters Memorial (1998), Albany, New York
Firemen's Memorial (Manhattan) (1913), New York City, a monument on Riverside Drive at 100th Street in Manhattan
Firefighters' Memorial Bridge (Pittston, Pennsylvania)
Fireman's Drinking Fountain (1909), Slatington, Lehigh County, Pennsylvania
Vigilant Fire Company Firemen's Monument, Washington Township, Pennsylvania, NRHP-listed
Collyer Monument (1890), Pawtucket, Rhode Island, NRHP-listed.
Fallen Firefighters Memorial (Wu), Seattle, Washington
Peshtigo Fire Cemetery and the Peshtigo Fire Museum, commemorating victims of the 1871 fire, Peshtigo, Wisconsin
Wisconsin State Firefighters Memorial (1996 or after), Wisconsin Rapids, Wisconsin

See also
Women in firefighting.

References

See also
List of fire stations
:Category:Firefighting museums

 

Monuments and memorials
Firefighting in the United States